Three car bombs exploded in mainly Shia areas of Baghdad, killing at least 63 people and injuring more than 120 on 18 February 2007. It happened despite a huge military offensive was going on, led by US and Iraqi troops.

One of the killed, Ehab Karim, is a midfield footballer for Al Sinaa.

References

External links
Car bombs kill scores in Baghdad (Aljazeera)
Baghdad car bombs leave 60 dead – BBC News

2007 murders in Iraq
Car and truck bombings in Iraq
Terrorist incidents in Iraq in 2007
Terrorist incidents in Baghdad
Mass murder in 2007
2000s in Baghdad
Violence against Shia Muslims in Iraq
February 2007 events in Iraq